Juliët Post (born 26 December 1997) is a former Dutch cricketer. She is a former captain of the Netherlands women's national cricket team.

Career
She played for the Netherlands women's cricket team in the 2015 ICC Women's World Twenty20 Qualifier in November 2015.

In June 2018, she was named in the Netherlands' squad for the 2018 ICC Women's World Twenty20 Qualifier tournament. She made her Women's Twenty20 International (WT20I) for the Netherlands against United Arab Emirates in the World Twenty20 Qualifier on 14 July 2018.

In May 2019, she was named as the captain of the Netherlands' squad for the 2019 ICC Women's Qualifier Europe tournament in Spain. In August 2019, she was named as the captain of the Dutch squad for the 2019 ICC Women's World Twenty20 Qualifier tournament in Scotland. In October 2021, she was named in the Dutch team for the 2021 Women's Cricket World Cup Qualifier tournament in Zimbabwe.

References

External links
 

1997 births
Living people
Dutch women cricketers
Netherlands women One Day International cricketers
Netherlands women Twenty20 International cricketers
Place of birth missing (living people)
20th-century Dutch women
20th-century Dutch people
21st-century Dutch women